Crackerjack is a British children's television series which was initially aired on the BBC Television Service between 14 September 1955 and 21 December 1984 (with no series in 1971). The series was a variety show featuring comedy sketches, singers and quizzes, broadcast live with an audience.

On 11 February 2019, it was announced that Crackerjack would return in 2020, 35 years after it was last aired. It was hosted by Sam & Mark, with an exclamation mark added to its original title, and aired on CBBC from 17 January 2020. The second revived Crackerjack! series was confirmed to start filming in October 2020. In 2022, it was reported that the show had been cancelled.

Its initial long run featured Eamonn Andrews, Max Bygraves, Leslie Crowther, Ed "Stewpot" Stewart, Joe Baker, Jack Douglas, Stu Francis, Peter Glaze, Don Maclean, Michael Aspel, Christine Holmes, Jacqueline Clarke, Stuart Sherwin, Little and Large, Jan Hunt, The Krankies, Basil Brush, Geoffrey Durham, Bernie Clifton, Rod McLennan and Ronnie Corbett, amongst many others.

Performers who appeared as singers/dancers, assisting the host with games, included Sally Ann Triplett (Series 26; as a member of the duo Bardo, Triplett represented the United Kingdom in the Eurovision Song Contest 1982), Leigh Miles (Series 26–27; Miles was also a popular Hill's Angel in The Benny Hill Show), Julie Dorne-Brown (Series 27–28; later MTV VJ "Downtown" Julie Brown), Sara Hollamby (Series 28–29; now a television news and travel reporter), Ling Tai (Series 29), Jillian Comber and Pip Hinton.

Format

The shows were frantic, being broadcast live in front of an audience largely of children, originally at the King's Theatre on Hammersmith Road, London, used by the BBC as the King's Studio for live and recorded broadcasts until 1963, then at the BBC Television Theatre (now the Shepherd's Bush Empire). The format of the programme included competitive games for teams of children, a music spot, a comedy double act, and a finale in which the cast performs a short comic play, adapting popular songs of the day and incorporating them into the action.

One of the games was a quiz called Double or Drop, where each of three contestants was given a prize to hold for each question answered correctly, but given a cabbage if incorrect. They were out of the game if they dropped any of the items awarded or received a third cabbage. While the winner took his or her pick from a basket of toys, every runner-up won a much-envied marbled propelling pencil as a prize, which became so popular that in 1961 Queen Elizabeth II, who visited the programme, was presented with Crackerjack pencils for her children Prince Charles and Princess Anne.

During the early 1970s, high-profile pop guests included The Sweet, Mud, Gary Glitter and, on more than one occasion, Slade.

In 1982, in a bid to boost flagging ratings, Crackerjack introduced gunge into its games and launched a new game called Take a Chance in which the celebrity guests – one female, one male – could score extra points for the contestant they teamed up with by competing against Stu Francis in a quickfire question tie. A wrong answer or the opponent answering first would lead to Francis or the celebrity guest being covered in gunge. The gunge was always given a name relating to a random theme or to the celebrity guest (Howling Wind for Ian McCaskill, for example).

Transmissions

Original

Only 148 out of 451 episodes from the original 29 series of the show survive in the BBC archives. The earliest episode known to exist is Episode 12 of series 3 with Eamonn Andrews; of his tenure, Episode 16 of Series 6, Episode 2 of Series 7, Episode 3 of Series 8 and Episodes 1 and 17 of Series 9 also survive. None of the Leslie Crowther episodes are known to exist, and two episodes only (Episodes 12–13 of Series 18) of the Michael Aspel period survive. However, all of the Ed Stewart (Series 19–24) and Stu Francis (Series 25–29) periods remain.

Revival

References

External links

Crackerjack at BFI

1955 British television series debuts
2021 British television series endings
1950s British children's television series
1960s British children's television series
1970s British children's television series
1980s British children's television series
2020s British children's television series
CBBC shows
BBC children's television shows
British television series revived after cancellation
English-language television shows
Lost BBC episodes
Television series by BBC Studios
Television series featuring gunge